"Maybe I Deserve" is a song written, produced and performed by American contemporary R&B singer Tank, issued as the first single from his debut studio album Force of Nature (2001). The song is his biggest hit to date on the US Billboard Hot 100, peaking at number 38 in 2001.

Music video

The official music video for the song was directed by Jeremy Rall.

Track listings

Notes
 denotes additional producer(s)

Charts

Weekly charts

Year-end charts

References

External links
 
 

2000 songs
2001 singles
Blackground Records singles
Music videos directed by Jeremy Rall
Song recordings produced by Tank (American singer)
Songs written by Tank (American singer)
Tank (American singer) songs
Contemporary R&B ballads